The Samsung Galaxy Pocket (GT-S5300) is an Android smartphone manufactured by Samsung that was announced in March 2012. The handset is budget-oriented, sporting a relatively small 2.8-inch LCD. Its specifications are similar to that of the Samsung Galaxy Y. The Pocket is powered by an 832 MHz processor and offers a set of connectivity options including 3G, Wi-Fi and Bluetooth 3.0. Internally, it comes with 3 GiB of storage which can be further expanded to up to 32 GiB using a microSD card, and with 1200 mAh Li-ion battery.

Features 
The Samsung Galaxy Pocket comes with a tiny 2.80 inch QVGA Display. The device includes a 1200 mAh Li-ion battery, and offers a set of connectivity options including EDGE, HSDPA, Wi-Fi (b/g/n), and Bluetooth connectivity.  It also features GPS, a 2 megapixel rear camera, and the Social Hub app. The Social Hub combines every account registered on the phone to be unified in a single app.  The phone runs Samsung's TouchWiz 3.0 skinned Android 2.3.6 OS. The Samsung Galaxy Pocket is marketed as "Pocket Friendly," because it can be slipped inside pockets easily due to its small size.

Sales 
The Samsung Galaxy Pocket was available to buy in the UK on 30 April 2012 for £95.99.

The Samsung Galaxy Pocket is available to buy in Botswana for P899.95

See also 
 Samsung Galaxy Pocket 2, with 3G
 Samsung Galaxy Pocket Neo, released in June 2013
 Samsung Galaxy Pocket Duos, with dual-SIM
 Samsung Galaxy Y
 Samsung Galaxy Mini
 Samsung i5500 (Galaxy 5)

References

External links 

Samsung mobile phones
Samsung Galaxy
Samsung smartphones
Android (operating system) devices
Mobile phones introduced in 2012